The 1935 SMU Mustangs football team was an American football team that represented Southern Methodist University (SMU) in the Southwest Conference (SWC) during the 1935 college football season. In their first season under head coach Matty Bell, the Mustangs posted an overall record of 12–1 record with a mark of 6–0 in conference play, winning the SWC title. SMU was invited to the Rose Bowl, where they lost to Stanford. The Mustangs shut out eight of thirteen opponents and outscored all opponents by a total of 288 to 39 on the season.

SMU was named as the national champion in 1935 by the Dickinson System and Houlgate System, and retroactively by Berryman and Sagarin, and was one of five teams chosen by selectors recognized as official by the NCAA.

Two SMU players, halfback Bob Wilson and guard J. C. Wetsel, were selected as a consensus first-team player on the 1935 All-America college football team. In addition, tackle Truman Spain was selected as a first-team All-American by Collier's Weekly and as a second-team All-American by the Associated Press.

Schedule

References

External links
 Video of TCU contest

SMU
SMU Mustangs football seasons
College football national champions
Southwest Conference football champion seasons
SMU Mustangs football